This is a list of U.S. states and the District of Columbia by Employment-to-population ratio (population 16 and over).

List

See also
List of U.S. states and territories by unemployment rate
Job creation index
JOLTS report

References 

Economy of the United States
employment rate
States
employment rate
United States, employment rate